Vencer el miedo (English: Overcoming Fear) formerly known as Vencer el silencio, is a Mexican telenovela produced by Rosy Ocampo for Televisa. The series is a co-production between Televisa and Population Media Center. Production began on 2 July 2019 in Mexico City. The series is the first production of the "Vencer" franchise.

The series is starring an ensemble cast headed by Paulina Goto, Danilo Carrera, Emmanuel Palomares, Arcelia Ramírez, Alberto Estrella, and Jade Fraser.

Plot 
Vencer el miedo revolves around the stories of four women of different ages, whose lives will revolve around social and family issues such as teenage pregnancy, sexual harassment and, gender violence.

Cast

Main 
 Paulina Goto as Marcela Durán
 Danilo Carrera as Omar Cifuentes 
 Emmanuel Palomares as Rommel Guajardo
 Arcelia Ramírez as Inés Durán
 Alberto Estrella as Vicente Durán
 Jade Fraser as Cristina Durán
 Axel Ricco as Lorenzo Bracho
 Alejandro Ávila as David Cifuentes
 Pablo Valentín as Tulio Menéndez
 Marcelo Córdoba as Rubén Oliva
 Beatriz Moreno as Doña Efigenia "Efi" Cruz
 Carlos Bonavides as Father Antero
 Gabriela Carrillo as Maru Mendoza
 Michelle González as Elvira Tinoco
 Geraldine Galván as Jaqueline Montes
 Nicole Vale as Rebeca Rodríguez 
 Enrique Montaño as Rafael Conti 
 Karla Esquivel as Silvia Muñoz
 Yurem Rojas as Julio Ibarra "Sancho Clós"
 Luis Ceballos as Luis Ceballos
 Jonathan Becerra as El Yeison
 Beng Zeng as Marco Arizpe "La Liendre"
 Manuel Calderón as Gamaliel Robles "El Manchado"
 Eduardo Fernán as Víctor Pérez "El Huesos"
 Adanely Núñez as Mabel Garza de Cifuentes
 Pedro de Tavira as Eulalio Mitre
 Héctor Cruz Lara as Iván Eusebio
 Benjamín Islas
 Alessio Valentini as Yahir Luna
 Hanssel Casillas as Greñas Simón Rocha
 Valeria Castillo as Dina Álvarez 
 Emilia Berjón as Areli Durán
 Margarita Magaña as Magda
 Ariane Pellicer as Lupe
 Moisés Arizmendi as Fabián 
 Arlette Pacheco as Carmela
 César Évora as Horacio Cifuentes

Guest stars 
 Adalberto Parra as Don Neto
 Juan Carlos Barreto as Agustín
 Alejandra Jurado as Martina

Ratings 
 
}}

Episodes 

Notes

Awards and nominations

References

External links 
 

2020 telenovelas
Televisa telenovelas
2020 Mexican television series debuts
Spanish-language telenovelas
Television series about dysfunctional families
2020 Mexican television series endings
Mexican telenovelas